The Tinker Glacier is a 40 kilometre (25 mile) long glacier in Antarctica, draining the central part of the Southern Cross Mountains and flowing SE into Wood Bay, on the coast of Victoria Land. Named by the Northern Party of the New Zealand Geological Survey Antarctic Expedition (NZGSAE), 1962–63, for Lieutenant Col. Ron Tinker, leader at Scott Base during that season.

The Tinker Glacier Tongue is the seaward extension of the Tinker Glacier, projecting into the NW corner of Wood Bay on the coast of Victoria Land. The name was suggested by Advisory Committee on Antarctic Names (US-ACAN).

References

Glaciers of Victoria Land
Borchgrevink Coast